Mario Coll (born 20 August 1960) is a Colombian footballer. He played in five matches for the Colombia national football team from 1987 to 1990. He was also part of Colombia's squad for the 1987 Copa América tournament.

References

External links
 

1960 births
Living people
Colombian footballers
Colombia international footballers
Association football midfielders
People from Bucaramanga
Sportspeople from Santander Department